European Arenas Association (EAA) is a group of arenas with a range of hosting experiences, including: concerts, comedy, and sporting events… congresses, conferences, and trade fairs.

Executive committee
The European Arenas Association Board is composed of 8 members, including its President Olivier Toth of the Rockhal, General Manager Nancy Skipper, and Executive Officer Victoria Matthews.

Other board members include: Adrian Doyle of The Odyssey Trust, Girts Krastins of the Arena Riga, John Langford of London's O2, Lotta Nibell of Gothenburg's Scandinavium, and Jorge Vinha da Silva of Lisbon's Altice Arena.

Members
As of October 2022, the EAA website listed 35 member arenas and 2 arena clusters from across 20 nations, including: 6 UK listings, 4 from Germany, and 3 listings each from Spain and Sweden.

The 35 arenas are:

  Accor Arena
  Altice Arena
  AO Arena
  Arena Riga
  Avia Solutions Group Arena
  Barclays Arena
  Forest National
  Gliwice Arena
  Hallenstadion
  Helsinki Halli
  László Papp Budapest Sports Arena
  Malmö Arena
  Mediolanum Forum
  Mercedes-Benz Arena
  Navarra Arena
  O2 Arena
  O2 Arena
  Olympiapark
  OVO Arena
  OVO Hydro
  Palacio Vistalegre
  PalaLottomatica
  Palau Sant Jordi
  Paris La Défense Arena
  Resorts World Arena
  Rockhal
  Rotterdam Ahoy
  Saku Suurhall
  Scandinavium
  SSE Arena
  St. Jakobshalle
  Tauron Arena Kraków
  Telenor Arena
  Wiener Stadthalle
  Žalgirio Arena

The 2 arena clusters are:
  Hall Duo, composed of the Hanns-Martin-Schleyer-Halle and the Porsche-Arena
  Stockholm Live, composed of the Annexet, the Avicii Arena, the Friends Arena, the Hovet, the Södra Teatern, and the Tele2 Arena

Major events
Member arenas hosting experiences, include: Eurovision Song Contests, MTV Europe Music Awards, Summer Olympic events, and various World and European Championships.

Lisbon's Altice Arena, Stockholm's Avicii Arena, and the Rotterdam Ahoy have hosted both the Eurovision Song Contest and the MTV Europe Music Awards.

References

European sports federations
Indoor arenas
Pan-European trade and professional organizations
Entertainment organizations
Lists of indoor arenas